LCMC may refer to:

 Lutheran Congregations in Mission for Christ
 Life Cycle Management Command, subordinate commands within the United States Army Materiel Command
 LCMC Health, (Louisiana Children's Medical Center), New Orleans, United States
 Latur Municipal Corporation, Maharashtra, India
 Lehigh Coal Mining Company, subsidiary of Lehigh Coal & Navigation Company in Pennsylvania, United States